James Hyndman (born April 23, 1962 in Bonn, West Germany) is a Canadian television, film and stage actor. He is best known for his roles in the television series Rumeurs, for which he won a Gémeaux Award for Best Actor in a Comedy Series in 2003, and the film Rowing Through, for which he garnered a Genie Award nomination for Best Supporting Actor at the 17th Genie Awards in 1996.

His other credits have included the films Les Pots cassés, Eldorado, Polygraph, Memories Unlocked (Souvenirs intimes), The Marsh (Le Marais), Boris Without Béatrice (Boris sans Béatrice) and Underground (Souterrain), and the television series Diva, Les Hauts et les bas de Sophie Paquin, Le cœur a ses raisons and Trauma.

References

External links

1962 births
Canadian male film actors
Canadian male television actors
Canadian male voice actors
Canadian male stage actors
Actors from Bonn
Male actors from Montreal
German emigrants to Canada
Living people
20th-century Canadian male actors
21st-century Canadian male actors